Frank Ernst Gregory (July 25, 1888 – November 5, 1955) was a professional baseball player.  He was a right-handed pitcher for one season (1912) with the Cincinnati Reds.  For his career, he compiled a 2–0 record, with a 4.60 earned run average, and four strikeouts in 15⅔ innings pitched.

He was born in Spring Valley (town), Wisconsin and died in Beloit, Wisconsin at the age of 67.

External links

1888 births
1955 deaths
Cincinnati Reds players
Major League Baseball pitchers
Baseball players from Wisconsin
Ottumwa Packers players
Birmingham Barons players
Burlington Pathfinders players
People from Spring Valley (town), Wisconsin